Below are the family trees of all French monarchs, from Childeric I to Louis Philippe I.
For a more simplified view, see Family tree of French monarchs (simplified)

Key
Unlike in some other family trees, siblings here are not listed in birth order.

 : The blue border indicates French monarchs.
 : The bolded border indicates legitimate children of monarchs.
 : The thin border indicates other relatives.

Merovingian dynasty

Carolingian, Robertian, Bosonid dynasties

Capetian dynasty

House of Capet

House of Valois

House of Bourbon and Orléans

House of Bonaparte

See also
 Family tree of French monarchs (simplified)
 Kingdom of France
 List of French monarchs
 List of French consorts
 List of heirs to the French throne
 Family tree of German monarchs

Further reading

 

Dynasty genealogy
French monarchs